Luigi De Mossi (born 13 January 1960 in Siena) is an Italian politician and lawyer.

Life and career
He ran for Mayor of Siena as an independent at the 2018 Italian local elections, supported by a centre-right coalition formed by Lega Nord, Forza Italia, Brothers of Italy and the civic list "Voltiamo Pagina". He was elected Mayor of Siena and took office on 25 June 2018.

He appeared as Jessica's lawyer in the film The Face of an Angel, directed by Michael Winterbottom.

See also
2018 Italian local elections
List of mayors of Siena

References

1960 births
Living people
Mayors of Siena